Young Warriors, also known as The Graduates of Malibu High, is a low budget American crime-drama film starring James Van Patten, Ernest Borgnine, Richard Roundtree, and Lynda Day George. It was released theatrically by Cannon Films on August 26, 1983. It has only been released on VHS and on Laserdisc in the United Kingdom.

Plot
A young woman (April Dawn) is gang raped and murdered by the bikers in a California college town, sparking her brother Kevin (James Van Patten) to take up arms by night with a gang of like-minded vigilantes from his fraternity, brutally punishing any miscreants they catch in a criminal act. In the meantime, Kevin debates the issue of violent crime in the U.S. with his teachers and others during the day. As Kevin and his gang head toward a final, bloody confrontation with the low-lifes who murdered his sister, other scenes show the difference between his character, now violent, and the people he is supposedly protecting.

Cast
Ernest Borgnine - Lieutenant Bob Carrigan 
Richard Roundtree - Sergeant John Austin 
Lynda Day George - Beverly Carrigan 
James Van Patten - Kevin Carrigan 
Anne Lockhart - Lucy 
Tom Reilly - Scott 
Ed De Stefane - Stan 
Dick Shawn - Professor Hoover 
Mike Norris - Fred 
Linnea Quigley - Ginger
April Dawn - Tiffany Carrigan

Production
Young Warriors was intended as a sequel to Malibu High. Deran Sarafian claimed he took over direction. The film was produced by Victoria Paige Meyerink.

References

Citations

Sources

External links
 
 

1983 films
1983 action films
1983 crime drama films
Films about fraternities and sororities
Films set in California
Films shot in Washington (state)
American rape and revenge films
American vigilante films
Golan-Globus films
Films scored by Robert J. Walsh
1980s vigilante films
1980s English-language films
1980s American films